Bald Rock is a rural community of the Halifax Regional Municipality in the Canadian province of Nova Scotia on Cape Sambro on the southeast shore of the Chebucto Peninsula.

External links
Explore HRM
Cape Sambro

Communities in Halifax, Nova Scotia